Alan Barnes may refer to:

Alan Barnes (cricketer) (1850–1915), English cricketer
Alan Barnes (murder victim) ( 1962–1979), murder victim in Adelaide, possibly killed by Bevan Spencer von Einem
Alan Barnes (musician) (born 1959), English jazz musician
Alan Barnes (writer), British writer and editor in the field of cult film and television